Rimforest is an unincorporated community in the San Bernardino Mountains of San Bernardino County, California, United States.  It is located along California State Route 18. Rimforest has a post office with ZIP code 92378, which opened in 1949.  Rimforest was featured in a season 5 episode of Storage Wars.

References

External links
Rimforest on Google Maps

Unincorporated communities in San Bernardino County, California
Unincorporated communities in California